Types of eosinophilic leukemia include:

 Chronic eosinophilic leukemia
 Acute eosinophilic leukemia
 Clonal eosinophilia